Lachnocnema jolyana is a butterfly in the family Lycaenidae. It is found in Cameroon and the Republic of the Congo.

References

Butterflies described in 1996
Taxa named by Michel Libert
Miletinae